The Perfect Wife?! is a 1983 Hong Kong romantic comedy film directed Dean Shek and starring Shek, Eric Tsang and Linda Lau.

Plot
Dean Shek is flirty lawyer and expert at dealing with divorce cases who also likes to fool around with married women. One day, he attends the wedding of his friend Bluffer Wong and suddenly thinks about starting a family. Because of his lack of confidence in Hong Kong women, he asks someone to find a woman for him in mainland China and then transform her into his ideal wife. One day, Shek's cousin James Dean comes crying to him saying his fiancé left him for another man. Under Dean's encouragement, James seeks a new lover but finds interest in Dean's wife Chu. Chu is moved by James' gentleness and leaves Dean.

Cast
Dean Shek as Dean Shek
Eric Tsang as James Dean
Linda Lau as Chu
Paul Chun as Giddy
May Lo as Windy
Raymond Wong as Bluffer Wong
Wong Ching as Angry husband in car (cameo)
Lily Li
Jaime Chik as Bluffer's wife
Rebecca Chan as Girl who burglarized Shek's home
Wong Sau-man as Chiang Chin
Margaret Lee as wife in bar
Angela Pan as Mrs. Deanie Chow
Kelly Yiu as Student in mortarboard (cameo)
Fung King-man as Peter Chow (cameo)
Shrila Chun as Shek's neighbor
Cheng Miu as judge
Robert Siu as Shek's legal assistant
Shirley Kwan as Robert's wife
Lam Kwok-wai as Robert
Sze Kai-keung
Yolande Yau
Brenda Lo
James Lai as Clerk of the Court
Wellington Fung as Peter
Ng Leung
Leung Kit-wah
Cheng Mang-ha as Shek's neighbor
Lau Leung-fat as Shek's neighbor
Law Wai-ping
Fung Kam-hung as Shek's chauffeur
Law Lan as Ho
Ma Sau-yin
Fu Yuk-lan
Kam Kwok-wai
Yung Sau-yee
Tsui Cheung-ying 
Mui Chi-ching
Ho Kwong-tai
Wong Hung

Theme song
The Perfect Wife?! (專撬牆腳)
Composer: Samuel Hui
Lyricist: Raymond Wong
Singer: Karl Maka

Box office
The film grossed HK$12,946,443 at the Hong Kong box office during its theatrical run from 5 to 23 August 1983 in Hong Kong.

References

External links

The Perfect Wife?! at Hong Kong Cinemagic

1983 films
1983 romantic comedy films
Hong Kong romantic comedy films
Films directed by Dean Shek
1980s Cantonese-language films
Films set in Hong Kong
Films shot in Hong Kong
1980s Hong Kong films